

Events

Pre-1600
AD 69 – The Roman Senate declares Vespasian emperor of Rome, the last in the Year of the Four Emperors.
1124 – Pope Honorius II is consecrated, having been elected after the controversial dethroning of Pope Celestine II.
1140 – After a siege of several weeks, the city of Weinsberg and its castle surrender to Conrad III of Germany.
1237 – The city of Ryazan is sacked by the Mongol army of Batu Khan.
1361 – The Battle of Linuesa is fought in the context of the Spanish Reconquista between the forces of the Emirate of Granada and the combined army of the Kingdom of Castile and of Jaén resulting in a Castilian victory.
1598 – Battle of Curalaba: The revolting Mapuche, led by cacique Pelentaru, inflict a major defeat on Spanish troops in southern Chile.

1601–1900
1620 – Plymouth Colony: William Bradford and the Mayflower Pilgrims land near what is now known as Plymouth Rock in Plymouth, Massachusetts.
1826 – American settlers in Nacogdoches, Mexican Texas, declare their independence, starting the Fredonian Rebellion.
1832 – Egyptian–Ottoman War: Egyptian forces decisively defeat Ottoman troops at the Battle of Konya.
1844 – The Rochdale Society of Equitable Pioneers commences business at its cooperative in Rochdale, England, starting the Cooperative movement.
1861 – Medal of Honor: Public Resolution 82, containing a provision for a Navy Medal of Valor, is signed into law by President Abraham Lincoln.
1872 – Challenger expedition: , commanded by Captain George Nares, sails from Portsmouth, England.
1879 – World premiere of Henrik Ibsen's A Doll's House at the Royal Theatre in Copenhagen, Denmark.
1883 – The Royal Canadian Dragoons and The Royal Canadian Regiment, the first Permanent Force cavalry and infantry regiments of the Canadian Army, are formed.

1901–present
1907 – The Chilean Army commits a massacre of at least 2,000 striking saltpeter miners in Iquique, Chile.
1910 – An underground explosion at the Hulton Bank Colliery No. 3 Pit in Over Hulton, Westhoughton, England, kills 344 miners.
1913 – Arthur Wynne's "word-cross", the first crossword puzzle, is published in the New York World.
1919 – American anarchist Emma Goldman is deported to Russia.
1923 – United Kingdom and Nepal formally sign an agreement of friendship, called the Nepal–Britain Treaty of 1923, which superseded the Treaty of Sugauli signed in 1816.
1934 – Lieutenant Kijé, one of Sergei Prokofiev's best-known works, premiered.
1936 – First flight of the Junkers Ju 88 multi-role combat aircraft.
1937 – Snow White and the Seven Dwarfs, the world's first full-length animated feature, premieres at the Carthay Circle Theatre.
1941 – World War II: A Thai-Japanese Pact of Alliance is signed.
1946 – An 8.1 Mw earthquake and subsequent tsunami in Nankaidō, Japan, kills over 1,300 people and destroys over 38,000 homes.
1963 – "Bloody Christmas" begins in Cyprus, ultimately resulting in the displacement of 25,000–30,000 Turkish Cypriots and destruction of more than 100 villages.
1965 – International Convention on the Elimination of All Forms of Racial Discrimination is adopted.
1967 – Louis Washkansky, the first man to undergo a human-to-human heart transplant, dies in Cape Town, South Africa, having lived for 18 days after the transplant.
1968 – Apollo program: Apollo 8 is launched from the Kennedy Space Center, placing its crew on a lunar trajectory for the first visit to another celestial body by humans.
1970 – First flight of F-14 multi-role combat aircraft.
1973 – The Geneva Conference on the Arab–Israeli conflict opens.
1979 – Lancaster House Agreement: An independence agreement for Rhodesia is signed in London by Lord Carrington, Sir Ian Gilmour, Robert Mugabe, Joshua Nkomo, Bishop Abel Muzorewa and S.C. Mundawarara.
1988 – A bomb explodes on board Pan Am Flight 103 over Lockerbie, Dumfries and Galloway, Scotland, killing 270. This is to date the deadliest air disaster to occur on British soil. 
  1988   – The first flight of Antonov An-225 Mriya, the largest aircraft in the world.
1992 – A Dutch DC-10, flight Martinair MP 495, crashes at Faro Airport, killing 56.
1995 – The city of Bethlehem passes from Israeli to Palestinian control.
1999 – The Spanish Civil Guard intercepts a van loaded with 950 kg of explosives that ETA intended to use to blow up Torre Picasso in Madrid, Spain.
  1999   – Cubana de Aviación Flight 1216 overshoots the runway at La Aurora International Airport, killing 18.
2004 – Iraq War: A suicide bomber kills 22 at the forward operating base next to the main U.S. military airfield at Mosul, Iraq, the single deadliest suicide attack on American soldiers.
2020 – A great conjunction of Jupiter and Saturn occurs, with the two planets separated in the sky by 0.1 degrees. This is the closest conjunction between the two planets since 1623.

Births

Pre-1600

 968 – Minamoto no Yorinobu, Japanese samurai (d. 1048)
1401 – Masaccio, Italian painter (d. 1428)
1468 – William Conyers, 1st Baron Conyers, English baron (d. 1524)
1505 – Thomas Wriothesley, 1st Earl of Southampton, English politician (d. 1550)
1538 – Luigi d'Este, Catholic cardinal (d. 1586)
1542 – Thomas Allen, English mathematician and astrologer (d. 1632)
1550 – Man Singh I, Mughal noble (d. 1614)
1596 – Peter Mohyla, Ruthenian Orthodox metropolitan and saint (d. 1646)

1601–1900
1603 – Roger Williams, English minister, theologian, and politician, 9th President of the Colony of Rhode Island (d. 1684)
1615 – Benedict Arnold, Rhode Island colonial governor (d. 1678)
1672 – Benjamin Schmolck, German pastor and composer (d. 1737)
1714 – John Bradstreet, Canadian-English general (d. 1774)
1728 – Hermann Raupach, German harpsichord player and composer (d. 1778)
1778 – Anders Sandøe Ørsted, Danish jurist and politician, 3rd Prime Minister of Denmark (d. 1860)
1795 – Jack Russell, English priest, hunter, and dog breeder (d. 1883)
  1795   – Leopold von Ranke, German historian, author, and academic (d. 1886)
1803 – Achille Vianelli, Italian painter and academic (d. 1894)
1804 – Benjamin Disraeli, English lawyer and politician, Prime Minister of the United Kingdom (d. 1881)
1805 – Thomas Graham, Scottish chemist and academic (d. 1869)
1811 – Archibald Tait, Scottish-English archbishop (d. 1882)
1815 – Thomas Couture, French painter and educator (d. 1879)
1820 – William H. Osborn, American businessman (d. 1894)
1830 – Bartolomé Masó, Cuban soldier and politician (d. 1907)
1832 – John H. Ketcham, American general and politician (d. 1906)
1840 – Namık Kemal, Turkish journalist, playwright, and activist (d. 1888)
1843 – Thomas Bracken, Irish-New Zealander journalist, poet, and politician (d. 1898)
1850 – Zdeněk Fibich, Czech composer and poet (d. 1900)
1851 – Thomas Chipman McRae, American lawyer and politician, 26th Governor of Arkansas (d. 1929)
1857 – Joseph Carruthers, Australian politician, 16th Premier of New South Wales (d. 1932)
1859 – Gustave Kahn, French poet and critic (d. 1936)
1866 – Maud Gonne, Irish nationalist and political activist (d. 1953)
1868 – George W. Fuller, American chemist and engineer (d. 1934)
1872 – Trevor Kincaid, Canadian-American zoologist and academic (d. 1970) 
  1872   – Lorenzo Perosi, Italian priest and composer (d. 1956)
  1872   – Albert Payson Terhune, American journalist and author (d. 1942)
1876 – Jack Lang, Australian lawyer and politician, 23rd Premier of New South Wales (d. 1975)
1877 – Jaan Sarv, Estonian mathematician and scholar (d. 1954)
1878 – Jan Łukasiewicz, Polish-Irish mathematician and philosopher (d. 1956)
1884 – María Cadilla, Puerto Rican writer, educator, women's rights activist (d. 1951)
1885 – Frank Patrick, Canadian ice hockey player and coach (d. 1960)
1888 – Jean Bouin, French runner and rugby player (d. 1914)
1889 – Sewall Wright, American geneticist and biologist (d. 1988)
1890 – Hermann Joseph Muller, American geneticist and biologist, Nobel Prize laureate (d. 1967)
1891 – John William McCormack, American lawyer and politician, 53rd Speaker of the United States House of Representatives (d. 1980)
1892 – Walter Hagen, American golfer (d. 1969)
  1892   – Rebecca West, English journalist and author (d. 1983) 
1896 – Konstantin Rokossovsky, Marshal of the Soviet Union during World War II (d. 1968)
1900 – Luis Arturo González López, Guatemalan supreme court judge and briefly acting president (d. 1965)

1901–present
1905 – Anthony Powell, English author (d. 2000)
  1905   – Käte Fenchel, German mathematician (d. 1983)
1909 – Seichō Matsumoto, Japanese journalist and author (d. 1992)
1911 – Josh Gibson, American baseball player (d. 1947)
1913 – Arnold Friberg, American illustrator and painter (d. 2010)
1914 – Frank Fenner, Australian microbiologist and virologist (d. 2010)
1915 – Werner von Trapp, Austrian-American singer (d. 2007)
1917 – Heinrich Böll, German novelist and short story writer, Nobel Prize laureate (d. 1985)
1918 – Donald Regan, American colonel and politician, 11th White House Chief of Staff (d. 2003)
  1918   – Kurt Waldheim, Austrian colonel and politician; 9th President of Austria (d. 2007)
1919 – Doug Young, American voice actor (d. 2018)
1920 – Alicia Alonso, Cuban ballerina and choreographer, founded the Cuban National Ballet (d. 2019)
  1920   – Adele Goldstine, American computer programmer (d. 1964)
1922 – Itubwa Amram, Nauruan pastor and politician (d. 1989)
  1922   – Paul Winchell, American actor, voice artist, and ventriloquist (d. 2005)
  1922   – Cécile DeWitt-Morette, French mathematician and physicist (d. 2017)
1923 – Wataru Misaka, American basketball player (d. 2019)
1926 – Arnošt Lustig, Czech author and playwright (d. 2011)
  1926   – Joe Paterno, American football player and coach (d. 2012)
1930 – Phil Roman, American animator
1932 – U. R. Ananthamurthy, Indian author, poet, and critic (d. 2014)
  1932   – Edward Hoagland, American author and critic
1933 – Jackie Hendriks, Jamaican cricketer
  1933   – Robert Worcester, American businessman and academic, founded MORI
1934 – Giuseppina Leone, Italian sprinter
  1934   – Hanif Mohammad, Pakistani cricketer (d. 2016)
1935 – John G. Avildsen, American director, producer, and cinematographer (d. 2017)
  1935   – Lorenzo Bandini, Italian racing driver (d. 1967)
  1935   – Phil Donahue, American talk show host and producer
  1935   – Edward Schreyer, Canadian academic and politician, Governor General of Canada
  1935   – Stela Popescu, Romanian actress (d. 2017)
1937 – Jane Fonda, American actress and activist
1939 – Lloyd Axworthy, Canadian academic and politician, 2nd Canadian Minister of Foreign Affairs
  1939   – Wafic Saïd, Syrian-Saudi Arabian financier, businessman and philanthropist
1940 – Frank Zappa, American singer-songwriter, guitarist, composer and producer (d. 1993)
1942 – Hu Jintao, Chinese engineer and politician, 5th Paramount leader of China
1943 – Albert Lee, English guitarist and songwriter 
  1943   – Walter Spanghero, French rugby player
1944 – Michael Tilson Thomas, American pianist, composer, and conductor
  1944   – Zheng Xiaoyu, Chinese diplomat (d. 2007)
1945 – Doug Walters, Australian cricketer
1946 – Roy Karch, American director, producer, and screenwriter
  1946   – Carl Wilson, American singer-songwriter and guitarist (d. 1998)
1947 – Paco de Lucía, Spanish guitarist, songwriter, and producer (d. 2014)
1948 – Barry Gordon, American actor and voice artist; longest-serving president of the Screen Actors Guild (1988–95)
  1948   – Samuel L. Jackson, American actor and producer
  1948   – Dave Kingman, American baseball player
1949 – Thomas Sankara, Burkinabé captain and politician, 5th President of Burkina Faso (d. 1987)
  1949   – Nikolaos Sifounakis, Greek lawyer and politician
1950 – Jeffrey Katzenberg, American screenwriter and producer, co-founded DreamWorks Animation
  1950   – Lillebjørn Nilsen, Norwegian singer-songwriter and guitarist
  1950   – Max Maven, American magician and mentalist (d. 2022)
1951 – Steve Perryman, English footballer and manager
1952 – Joaquín Andújar, Dominican baseball player (d. 2015)
  1952   – Steve Furniss, American swimmer
1953 – András Schiff, Hungarian-English pianist and conductor
  1953   – Betty Wright, American singer-songwriter (d. 2020)
1954 – Chris Evert, American tennis player and coach
1955 – Jane Kaczmarek, American actress
  1955   – Kazuyuki Sekiguchi, Japanese singer-songwriter and bass player 
1956 – Dave Laut, American shot putter (d. 2009)
1957 – Ray Romano, American actor, producer, and screenwriter
1958 – Tamara Bykova, Russian high jumper
1959 – Florence Griffith Joyner, American sprinter and actress (d. 1998)
  1959   – Krishnamachari Srikkanth, Indian cricketer
1960 – Sherry Rehman, Pakistani journalist, politician, and diplomat, 25th Pakistan Ambassador to the United States
1961 – Ryuji Sasai, Japanese bass player and composer
1963 – Govinda, Indian actor, singer, and politician
1964 – Joe Kocur, Canadian ice hockey player and coach
  1964   – Kunihiko Ikuhara, Japanese director and illustrator
1965 – Glenn Coleman, Australian rugby league player
  1965   – Andy Dick, American actor and comedian
  1965   – Anke Engelke, Canadian-German actress, director, and screenwriter
1966 – William Ruto, 5th President of Kenya
  1966   – Kiefer Sutherland, British-Canadian actor, director, and producer
1967 – Terry Mills, American basketball player and coach
  1967   – Mikheil Saakashvili, Georgian lawyer and politician, 3rd President of Georgia
1969 – Julie Delpy, French model, actress, director, and screenwriter
  1969   – Mihails Zemļinskis, Latvian footballer, coach, and manager
1971 – Matthieu Chedid, French singer-songwriter and guitarist
1972 – Y. S. Jaganmohan Reddy, Indian Politician, 17th Chief Minister of Andhra Pradesh
1973 – Irakli Alasania, Georgian colonel and politician, Georgian Minister of Defense
  1973   – Matías Almeyda, Argentine footballer and manager
1974 – Karrie Webb, Australian golfer
1975 – Paloma Herrera, Argentinian ballerina
1977 – Emmanuel Macron, President of France
  1977   – Leon MacDonald, New Zealand rugby player
1978 – Emiliano Brembilla, Italian swimmer
  1978   – Charles Dera, American pornographic actor, dancer, model, and mixed martial arts fighter
  1978   – Shaun Morgan, South African musician, singer, and guitarist
1979 – Steve Montador, Canadian ice hockey player (d. 2015)
1981 – Cristian Zaccardo, Italian footballer
1982 – Philip Humber, American baseball player
1983 – Steven Yeun, American actor
1985 – Tom Sturridge, English actor
1988 – Perri Shakes-Drayton, English sprinter and hurdler
1989 – Mark Ingram II, American football player
  1989   – Tamannaah, South Indian actress
1991 – Riccardo Saponara, Italian footballer
1995 – Ronnie Bassett Jr., American race car driver
  1995   – Kelly Smith, English rugby union player
2002 – Clara Tauson, Danish tennis player

Deaths

Pre-1600
AD 72 – Thomas the Apostle, Roman martyr and saint (b. 1 AD)
 882 – Hincmar, French archbishop and historian (b. 806)
 956 – Sun Sheng, Chinese chancellor
 975 – Al-Mu'izz, Fatimid caliph (b. 932)
1001 – Hugh of Tuscany, Italian margrave (b. 950)
1215 – Ali ibn Muhammad ibn al-Walid, Dāʿī al-Muṭlaq of Tayyibi Isma'ilism (b. c. 1128)
1308 – Henry I, Landgrave of Hesse (b. 1244)
1338 – Thomas Hemenhale, bishop of Worcester
1362 – Constantine III, king of Armenia (b. 1313)
1375 – Giovanni Boccaccio, Italian author and poet (b. 1313)
1504 – Berthold von Henneberg, German archbishop (b. 1442)
1536 – John Seymour, English courtier (b. 1474)
1549 – Marguerite de Navarre, queen of Henry II of Navarre (b. 1492)
1581 – Jean de la Cassière, 51st Grandmaster of the Knights Hospitaller (b. 1502)
1597 – Peter Canisius, Dutch priest and saint (b. 1521)

1601–1900
1608 – William Davison, secretary to Queen Elizabeth I of England (b. c. 1541)
1610 – Catherine Vasa, Swedish princess (b. 1539)
1701 – Sir Hugh Paterson, Baronet of Bannockburn (b. 1659)
1807 – John Newton, English soldier and minister (b. 1725)
1824 – James Parkinson, English physician and paleontologist (b. 1755)
1869 – Friedrich Ernst Scheller, German jurist and politician (b. 1791)
1873 – Francis Garnier, French admiral and explorer (b. 1839)
1889 – Friedrich August von Quenstedt, German geologist and palaeontologist (b. 1809)

1901–present
1920 – Mohammed Abdullah Hassan, leader of the Dervish movement (b. 1856)
1929 – I. L. Patterson, American politician, 18th Governor of Oregon (b. 1859)
1933 – Knud Rasmussen, Greenlandic anthropologist and explorer (b. 1879)
1935 – Ted Birnie, English footballer and manager (b. 1878)
  1935   – Kurt Tucholsky, German-Swedish journalist and author (b. 1890)
1937 – Violette Neatley Anderson, American judge (b. 1882)
  1937   – Ted Healy, American comedian and actor (b. 1896)
  1937   – Frank B. Kellogg, American lawyer and politician, 45th United States Secretary of State, Nobel Prize laureate (b. 1856)
1940 – F. Scott Fitzgerald, American novelist and short story writer (b. 1896)
1945 – George S. Patton, American general (b. 1885)
1948 – Władysław Witwicki, Polish psychologist, philosopher, translator, historian (of philosophy and art) and artist (b. 1878)
1952 – Kenneth Edwards, American golfer (b. 1886)
1953 – Kaarlo Koskelo, Finnish-American wrestler and businessman (b. 1888)
1957 – Eric Coates, English viola player and composer (b. 1886)
1958 – H.B. Warner, English actor (b. 1875)
  1958   – Lion Feuchtwanger, German-American author and playwright (b. 1884)
1959 – Rosanjin, Japanese calligrapher, engraver, and painter (b. 1883)
1963 – Jack Hobbs, English cricketer and journalist (b. 1882)
1964 – Carl Van Vechten, American author and photographer (b. 1880)
1965 – Claude Champagne, Canadian violinist, pianist, and composer (b. 1891)
1968 – Vittorio Pozzo, Italian footballer, coach, and manager (b. 1886)
1974 – Richard Long, American actor and director (b. 1927)
1982 – Abu Al-Asar Hafeez Jullundhri, Pakistani poet and composer (b. 1900)
1983 – Paul de Man, Belgian-born philosopher, literary critic and theorist (b. 1919)
1988 – Nikolaas Tinbergen, Dutch-English ethologist and ornithologist, Nobel Prize laureate (b. 1907)
1992 – Stella Adler, American actress and educator (b. 1901)
  1992   – Albert King, American singer-songwriter, guitarist, and producer (b. 1924)
  1992   – Nathan Milstein, Russian-American violinist and composer (b. 1903)
1998 – Ernst-Günther Schenck, German colonel and physician (b. 1904)
2004 – Autar Singh Paintal, Indian physiologist and neurologist (b. 1925)
2006 – Saparmurat Niyazov, Turkmen engineer and politician, 1st President of Turkmenistan (b. 1940)
2009 – Edwin G. Krebs, American biochemist and academic, Nobel Prize laureate (b. 1918)
  2009   – Christos Lambrakis, Greek journalist and businessman (b. 1934)
2010 – Enzo Bearzot, Italian footballer and manager (b. 1927)
2013 – Edgar Bronfman, Sr., Canadian-American businessman and philanthropist (b. 1929)
  2013   – John Eisenhower, American historian, general, and diplomat, 45th United States Ambassador to Belgium (b. 1922)
2014 – Udo Jürgens, Austrian-Swiss singer-songwriter and pianist (b. 1934)
  2014   – Sitor Situmorang, Indonesian poet and author (b. 1923)
  2014   – Billie Whitelaw, English actress (b. 1932)
2017 – Bruce McCandless II, US astronaut who conducted the first untethered spacewalk (b. 1937)
2019 – Andrew Clennel Palmer, British engineer (b. 1938)

Holidays and observances
Armed Forces Day (Philippines)
Christian feast day:
O Oriens
Peter Canisius
Thomas the Apostle (Anglicanism)
December 21 (Eastern Orthodox liturgics)
 Earliest usual date for the winter solstice in the Northern Hemisphere and the summer solstice in the Southern Hemisphere, and its related observances:
Blue Christmas (some modern American liberal Protestant groups)
Dongzhi Festival (Asia)
Sanghamitta Day (Theravada Buddhism)
Yule in the Northern Hemisphere (Neopagan Wheel of the Year)
Ziemassvētki (ancient Latvia)
Forefathers' Day (Plymouth, Massachusetts)
São Tomé Day (São Tomé and Príncipe)
The first day of Pancha Ganapati, celebrated until December 25 (Saiva Siddhanta Church)

References

External links

 BBC: On This Day
 
 Historical Events on December 21

Days of the year
December